Glinsko is a settlement in the City Municipality of Celje in eastern Slovenia. It lies on the northeastern outskirts of the town of Celje. The area is part of the traditional region of Styria and is now included into the Savinja Statistical Region.

References

External links
Glinsko on Geopedia

Populated places in the City Municipality of Celje